The Metropolitan Railway F class was a class of 0-6-2T side tank steam locomotive. They were based on the earlier E Class. Four locomotives, numbered 90 to 93 were built by Yorkshire Engine Company in 1901. They were later numbered L49 to L52.

Service
The F Class were intended to work freight trains over the Metropolitan Railway mainline.

Withdrawal
All remained with London Transport until they were withdrawn and scrapped between 1957 and 1962.

References

External links 
 http://www.railwayarchive.org.uk/stories/pages.php?enum=LE130&pnum=14&maxp=18
 another photo

F
0-6-2T locomotives
YEC locomotives
Railway locomotives introduced in 1901
Standard gauge steam locomotives of Great Britain

Scrapped locomotives